Men's Giant Slalom World Cup 2002/2003

Final point standings

In Men's Giant Slalom World Cup 2002/03 all results count. Michael von Grünigen won his fourth Giant Slalom World Cup.

Note:

In the last race only the best racers were allowed to compete and only the best 15 finishers were awarded with points.

References
 fis-ski.com

World Cup
FIS Alpine Ski World Cup men's giant slalom discipline titles